Geoffrey Bent (27 September 1932 – 6 February 1958) was an English footballer who played as a full-back. He was one of the eight Manchester United players who lost their lives in the Munich air disaster.

Personal life
Bent was born at Irlams o' th' Height in Pendleton, Salford, Lancashire in September 1932. He was the only child of miner Clifford Bent and his wife Clara.

He married Marion Mallandaine at Bolton in 1953 and their daughter Karen was born in September 1957. He died in the Munich air disaster on 6 February 1958 and was buried in St. John's Churchyard in Irlams o' th' Height.

He was survived by both of his parents as well as his wife and daughter, who was five months old at the time of his death.

Career 
He joined United as an apprentice on leaving school in the summer of 1948. After several seasons playing in the reserve and youth sides, he became a professional in 1951 and made his first team debut in the 1954-55 season, but never held a regular place in the first team. Over a period of three seasons, he made 12 league appearances as full-back cover for Roger Byrne on the left and Bill Foulkes on the right.

He did not play any first-team games during the 1957–58 season, having been on the sidelines for several months with a broken foot, and only travelled to Belgrade as cover for Roger Byrne – who had recently been injured and whose fitness was in doubt.

Legacy 
His widow Marion made a number of television contributions in the years afterwards, including a 1998 ITV documentary, The Busby Babes: End of a Dream, which marked the 40th anniversary of the tragedy, as well as the 1975 John Roberts book The Team That Wouldn't Die, which included chapters documenting the stories of each of the eight players who died and included interviews with their surviving family members.

Career statistics

References

Further reading
 The Team That Wouldn't Die, John Roberts (1974)

External links
Forgotten Grave of a Busby Babe

1932 births
1958 deaths
Footballers from Salford
English footballers
Manchester United F.C. players
Association football fullbacks
English Football League players
Footballers killed in the Munich air disaster